Cephalostachyum is a genus of Asian and Madagascan bamboo in the grass family.

The plants are of small to medium size compared to most other bamboo. Their choice habitats are mountain to lowland forests.

Species

formerly included
see Bambusa Cathariostachys Dendrocalamus Kinabaluchloa Schizostachyum 

Museums
Chinese maps show a Cephalostachyum Museum in Beijing. However, this appears to be a mistranslation; the museum is actually dedicated to the diabolo, a kind of yo-yo made of bamboo.

See also
List of Poaceae genera

References

Bambusoideae
Bambusoideae genera